Louis Byron Oubre, III (born May 15, 1958) is an American former professional football player who was a guard in the National Football League (NFL) for five seasons during the 1980s.  He played college football for the Oklahoma Sooners and earned All-American honors.  He played professionally for the NFL's New Orleans Saints, and later the Miami Dolphins.

He was born in New Orleans, Louisiana, where he played at St. Augustine High School. He was a member of the Purple Knights' 1975 Class AAAA state championship team.

Louis B. Oubre, III attended the University of Oklahoma, coached by College Football Hall of Fame Coach Barry Switzer where he played for the Sooners from 1977 to 1980.  As a senior in 1980, he was recognized as a consensus first-team All-American.

He later served as the Offensive Line Coach on Cedar Hill High School Football team from 2009-2017 winning two state championships in 2015 and 2016. He retired from coaching in 2018. He is also featured in the book What It Means to Be a Sooner by Jeff Snook.

External links
Oklahoma Sooners bio

1958 births
Living people
Players of American football from New Orleans
St. Augustine High School (New Orleans) alumni
All-American college football players
American football offensive guards
Miami Dolphins players
Philadelphia Eagles players
Oklahoma Sooners football players
National Football League replacement players
New Orleans Saints players